Daphne rosmarinifolia is a shrub, of the family Thymelaeaceae.  It is native to China, specifically Gansu, parts of Sichuan, and Yunnan.

Description
The shrub is evergreen, and grows from 0.3 to 1.0 m tall.  Its yellowish green branches grow dense. It is often found on shrubby slopes at altitudes of 2500 to 3800 m.

References

rosmarinifolia